Lakeland Maze Farm Park is an outdoor attraction and maze located near Kendal in England, UK.

History 
The first maze was created in 2005. In 2021, the maze was moved to a new field.

Theme

References 

Mazes in the United Kingdom
2004 establishments in England
Tourist attractions in Cumbria